Carlos Arboleya (born 23 July 1985) is a Uruguayan rugby union player. He was named in Uruguay's squad for the 2015 Rugby World Cup.

Test career

References

1985 births
Living people
Uruguayan rugby union players
Uruguay international rugby union players
Rugby union players from Montevideo
Rugby union props